This article presents a list of the historical events and publications of Australian literature during 1974.

Events 
 The Patrick White Award is presented for the first time. White used his 1973 Nobel Prize in Literature award to establish a trust for this prize.

Major publications

Books 
 James Aldridge – Mockery in Arms
 Jon Cleary – Peter's Pence
 Catherine Gaskin – The Property of a Gentleman 
 David Ireland – Burn
 Thomas Keneally – Blood Red, Sister Rose
 Colleen McCullough – Tim
 Ronald McKie – The Mango Tree
 Gerald Murnane – Tamarisk Row
 Morris West – Harlequin
 Thea Astley - A Kindness Cup

Short stories 
 Peter Carey – The Fat Man in History
 Frank Moorhouse – The Electrical Experience : A Discontinuous Narrative
 Patrick White – The Cockatoos : Shorter Novels and Stories

Science Fiction and Fantasy 
 A. Bertram Chandler – The Bitter Pill
 Cherry Wilder – "The Ark of James Carlyle"

Children's and Young Adult fiction 
 James Aldridge – The Marvellous Mongolian
 Mavis Thorpe Clark – The Sky is Free
 Ruth Park – Callie's Castle
 Joan Phipson – Helping Horse
 Colin Thiele
 Albatross Two
 Magpie Island

Poetry 

 Bruce Beaver – Lauds and Plaints : Poems (1968-1972)
 Robert Gray – Creekwater Journal
 Clive James –  Peregrine Prykke's Pilgrimage Through the London Literary World : A Tragedy in Heroic Couplets
 Jennifer Maiden – Tactics 
 David Malouf – Neighbours in a Thicket : Poems
 Les Murray – Lunch and Counter Lunch

Drama 
 Louis Nowra – The Death of Joe Orton
 David Williamson – The Department

Biography 
 Ivan Southall – Fly West

Awards and honours

Lifetime achievement

Literary

Children and Young Adult

Poetry

Births 
A list, ordered by date of birth (and, if the date is either unspecified or repeated, ordered alphabetically by surname) of births in 1974 of Australian literary figures, authors of written works or literature-related individuals follows, including year of death.

 9 June — Anna Goldsworthy, writer, teacher and classical pianist
 14 June — Scott Monk, author
 2 July — Matthew Reilly, author

Unknown date
 Alyssa Brugman, author of fiction for young adults
 Shaun Tan, artist and author

Deaths 
A list, ordered by date of death (and, if the date is either unspecified or repeated, ordered alphabetically by surname) of deaths in 1974 of Australian literary figures, authors of written works or literature-related individuals follows, including year of birth.

 7 January – Nan McDonald, writer for children (born 1921)
 21 January – R. G. Howarth, poet and critic (born 1906)
 June – Eve Langley, novelist and poet (born 1904)

See also 
 1974 in Australia
 1974 in literature
 1974 in poetry
 List of years in Australian literature
 List of years in literature

References

 
Australian literature by year
20th-century Australian literature
1974 in literature